Buș is a surname. Notable people with the surname include:

 Laurențiu Buș (born 1987), Romanian footballer
 Sergiu Buș (born 1992), Romanian footballer, brother of Laurențiu

See also
 Bus (surname)

Romanian-language surnames